Cocoa production is important to the economy of Nigeria. Cocoa is the leading agricultural export of the country and Nigeria is currently the world's fourth largest producer of cocoa, after  Ivory Coast, Indonesia and Ghana, and the third largest exporter, after Ivory Coast and Ghana. The crop was a major foreign exchange earner for Nigeria in the 1950s and 1960s and in 1970 the country was the second largest producer in the world but following investments in the oil sector in the 1970s and 1980s, Nigeria's share of world output declined. In 2010, cocoa production accounted for only 0.3% of agricultural GDP. Average cocoa beans production in Nigeria between 2000 and 2010 was 389,272 tonnes per year  rising from 170,000 tonnes produced in 1999.

History
The earliest cocoa farms in Nigeria were in Bonny and Calabar in the 1870s but the area proved not suitable for cultivation. In 1880, a cocoa farm was established in Lagos and later, a few more farms were established in Agege and Ota. From the farms in Agege and Ota information disseminated to the Yoruba hinterland about cocoa farming, thereafter, planting of the tree expanded in Western Nigeria. Farmers in Ibadan and Egba land began experimenting with planting cocoa in uncultivated forests in 1890 and those in Ilesha started around 1896. The planting of cocoa later spread to Okeigbo and Ondo Town both in Ondo State, Ife and Gbongan in Osun State and also in Ekiti land. Before 1950, there were two main varieties of cocoa planted in Nigeria. The major one was Amelonado cacao which was imported from the upper Amazon river Basin in Brazil. The second was a heterogeneous strain from Trinidad. The Amelonado pods are green but turning yellow when ripe but the Trinidad variety is red.

Cultivation and trade
Cocoa flourishes in areas that are not more than 20 degrees north or south of the equator. The trees respond well in regions with high temperature and distributed rainfall. In Nigeria, the cocoa tree is grown from seedlings which are raised in nurseries, when the seedlings reach a height of 3 cm they are transplanted at a distance of 3 to 4 meters. The cultivation of cocoa is done by many smallscale farmers on farmlands of around 2 hectares while export is dominated by a few firms.

Historically Nigeria's cocoa production was marketed through a monopsony by marketing boards created by the government. In the 1980s the World Bank and the International Monetary Fund advised Nigeria to liberalize the sector because the marketing boards were ineffective. In 1986, Nigeria dissolved the marketing boards and liberalized cocoa marketing and trade. However, trade has not yielded the anticipated results, in addition, aging trees and farms, low yields, inconsistent production patterns, disease incidence, npest attack and little agricultural mechanization has contributed to a stagnant cocoa industry. Currently, farmers sell their products indirectly through a cooperative or a licensed buying agent who in turn sell it to exporting firms.

The major states that produce cocoa are Ondo, Cross River, Ogun, Akwa Ibom, Ekiti, Delta, Osun and Oyo.

References

Agriculture in Nigeria
Economy of Nigeria
Cocoa production